This is a list of Tamil national-type primary schools (SJK(T)) in Penang, Malaysia. As of June 2022, there are 28 Tamil primary schools with a total of 5,382 students.

List of Tamil national-type primary schools in Penang

Central Seberang Perai District

Northeast Penang Island District

North Seberang Perai District

Southwest Penang Island District

South Seberang Perai District

See also 

 Tamil primary schools in Malaysia
 Lists of Tamil national-type primary schools in Malaysia

References

Schools in Penang
Penang
penang